Lyon Lea is a 1915 Hungarian film. It was directed by Alexander Korda (as Korda Sándor) and M. Miklós Pásztory.

It starred Péter Andorffy and Elemér Baló.

External links
Lyon Lea at IMDb
Lyon Lea at TCMDB
Lyon Lea at Hungarian Film

1915 films
Hungarian silent films
Hungarian drama films
1910s Hungarian-language films
Films directed by Alexander Korda
Hungarian films based on plays
Hungarian black-and-white films
Austro-Hungarian films
1915 drama films
Silent drama films